The 2011 Open de Suède Vårgårda – team time trial was the 4th team time trial running on the Open de Suède Vårgårda.

General standings (top 10)

Results from uci.ch.

References

External links
 Official website

2011 in women's road cycling
2011 in Swedish sport
2011 UCI Women's Road World Cup
2011